Henry Lim Bon Liong (林育慶) is the chief executive officer of Sterling Paper Group of Companies, S.P. Properties, Inc., SL Agritech Corporation and was a member of the governing council of the Philippine Council for Agriculture, Forestry, and Natural Resources Research and Development (PCARRD) from 2005 to 2007. He studied at St. Jude Catholic School.

Early life
Born to Maria Co Chiao Ti Lim and Lim Seh Leng, he belongs to one of the migrant Chinese families in the Philippines. They lived in a one-room apartment without a toilet and they cannot speak any Tagalog. Through his father's determination, they were given Filipino citizenship. His father founded Sterling Bookbinding with Sterling Family Photo Album as its main product. This bookbinding business flourished into Sterling Paper Products Enterprises in 1961, with school and office supplies aside from photo albums as products. In 1976, Lim Seh Leng died and Henry as the eldest, took over the business.

As an entrepreneur
Through Henry's management, the business expanded.  More products were introduced and retail outlets were established.

He also ventured into real estate  business, creating S.P. Properties, Inc. and the latest of which is the production of hybrid rice, through the establishment of SL Agritech Corporation in September 2006. SL Agritech Corporation aims to solve the insufficiency of rice supply in the Philippines. It is now the number one distributor of hybrid seeds throughout the Philippines and has now expanded to exporting rice to a number of countries including but not limited to Malaysia, Singapore, Indonesia, and Madagascar.

References
"Governing Council has 3 new members." (accessed on December 11, 2007).
"Indon state firm reports good harvest with hybrid rice seeds." (accessed on December 11, 2007).
"Hybrid rice firm targets fast food needs." (accessed on December 11, 2007).
 Almazan, Alec. A 'Sterling' Example of Entrepreneurship, Henry Lim Bon Liong. NEGOSYO. Quezon City: ABS-CBN Publishing, 2006.

Colegio de San Juan de Letran alumni
Filipino chief executives
20th-century Filipino businesspeople
Living people
Filipino people of Chinese descent
Year of birth missing (living people)
Recipients of the Order of Lakandula
21st-century Filipino businesspeople